The Gran Teatro Nacional del Perú (Grand National Theater of Peru) is a multi-purpose theatre and concert hall in Lima, Peru. It is part of the Cultural Tridium, flanked by the National Library of Peru and the Museo de la Nación.

The theatre was inaugurated on 23 July 2011. The theatre has a capacity of up to 1500 people, and uses the latest technology in acoustics and sound engineering to support performance genres ranging from opera, philharmonic orchestras, pop stars, Broadway shows and more. The building includes rehearsal rooms, dressing rooms, restaurants, cafeteria, library and rooms for various types of events.

In July 2012 it hosted a performance of the opera-ballet Akas Kas by Peruvian composer Nilo Valerde.

References

External links

Buildings and structures in Lima
Theatres in Peru
Deconstructivism
Tourist attractions in Lima
Concert halls in Peru
Opera houses in Peru